Pertechnetic acid (HTcO4) is a compound  of technetium that is produced by reacting technetium(VII) oxide (Tc2O7) with water or strong oxidizing acids, such as nitric acid, concentrated sulfuric acid or aqua regia.  The dark red hygroscopic substance is a strong acid, with a pKa of 0.32, as such it exists almost entirely as the pertechnetate ion in aqueous solution. The red color in solution is thought to be due to the formation of the polyoxometallate .

Use of strong enough acid solution, for example, concentrated sulfuric acid, can generate the protonated form, which then exists as the octahedral TcO3(OH)(H2O)2 dihydrate complex.

See also
 Sodium pertechnetate

References 

Pertechnetates
Mineral acids
Transition metal oxoacids